The Glass Cannon is a podcast featuring the Pathfinder Roleplaying Game by Paizo Publishing, and is the flagship podcast of The Glass Cannon Network (GCN). The first episode was released on June 16, 2015, and over 326 episodes were produced before the first campaign came to its conclusion in June of 2022. The initial adventure of the podcast followed the Giantslayer adventure path from Paizo supplemented by a significant amount of homebrew content to further flesh out the backstories of characters outside the purview of the main adventure path resources. Their irreverent, off-the-wall style complemented by their deep cinematic storytelling has made the Glass Cannon the bar against which most actual podcasts are measured. Listeners are encouraged to begin at Episode 1 “ Introducing Tom Exposition” for the full experience.

After receiving his MFA in Acting from Columbia University, Troy Lavallee spent the better part of two decades pounding the pavement as an actor and comedian in New York while bartending and holding odd jobs on the side. Troy came up with the idea for the Glass Cannon Podcast while gaming with his good friends Joe O'Brien and Skid Maher. At the time, there was a dearth of actual play podcasts and the ones that did exist were playing Dungeons & Dragons.The lack of Pathfinder RPG podcasts gave them a great opportunity to stand out in the crowd.

In 2017, the GCN signed a first of its kind licensing deal with Paizo, which was extended three years in 2018. This meant that they could monetize the show in an effort to grow beyond just one single podcast. Rather than muddy their flagship show with ads, they looked to a fairly new (at the time) crowdfunding platform called Patreon, where fans could subscribe at various tiers to unlock rewards and exclusive content. As subscriptions began to pour in, they were able to add a second weekly show, then a Patreon exclusive show, then suddenly the founders were leaving their jobs to work for this wild new start-up full-time and thus the Glass Cannon Network was born.

In 2018, they began a US Tour which to date has visited over 30 cities across the US. The tour follows Paizo's Strange Aeons Adventure Path which was converted to Pathfinder Second Edition in May of 2022.

In Spring of 2023, the second major campaign is set to launch on the Glass Cannon Podcast feed featuring the Pathfinder Second Edition Adventure Path Gatewalkers. Troy Lavallee will GM with fellow founders Joe O'Brien, Skid Maher and Matthew Capodicasa as players alongside GCN mainstays Sydney Amanuel and Kate Stamas.

Reviews
Geek & Sundry reviewed it as one of the best table top podcasts. Forbes describe it as engaging and bawdy but not for kids.

The podcast is considered to have a high production quality. Sound effects and music are made with Syrinscape.

References

External links
The Official Glass Cannon website
Nerd's Earth Interview

2015 podcast debuts
Actual play podcasts
Audio podcasts
Comedy and humor podcasts
Patreon creators